"Let Nature Sing" is a single released by the Royal Society for the Protection of Birds on 26 April 2019, consisting of 2 minutes 32 seconds of British birdsong. The track was mixed by Adrian Thomas, Sam Lee and Bill Barclay, and released by the RSPB through Horus Music. The single was created to raise awareness of threats to birds and its release was timed to coincide with International Dawn Chorus Day on 5 May 2019. It reached number 18 on the UK Singles Chart, marking the first time a recording solely of birds had entered the charts, and reached number 1 on the UK Singles Sales Chart.

Production

To raise awareness of the decline in birds over the last 50 years, the RSPB recruited the creative agency Glimpse to create a campaign to bring nature into popular culture. Part of the campaign was for a single to be released and enter the charts for International Dawn Chorus Day on 5 May 2019.

While producing the RSPB Guide to Birdsong, the author Adrian Thomas recorded samples of many different British bird songs between 2016 and 2019. Thomas then mixed some of these recordings together into a demo. Thomas then recruited the help of Bill Barclay, the musical director at the Globe Theatre, and the folk musician Sam Lee to arrange the recordings into a track. The final mix was produced by Andrew Mellor, recording engineer of the Philadelphia Orchestra.

To coincide with the release of the track, the RSPB organised a panel on "the musicality of nature" hosted by BBC Radio 6 presenter Shaun Keaveny, with Eliza Doolittle, Chrissie Rhodes of The Shires, and Sam Lee. The track was remixed by Diplo for the Nick Grimshaw drivetime show, creating a "donk" version.

Featured birds
The song features the songs of many different species, ranging from very common garden birds such as the blackbird and robin to endangered and rare species such as cranes, of which only a few pairs are found in the UK. These include:

 Cuckoo
 Nightingale
 Wren
 Blackbird
 Great spotted woodpecker
 Robin
 Collared dove
 Crane
 Curlew
 Lapwing
 Swift
 Bittern
 Turtle dove
 Chiffchaff
 Snipe
 Blackcap
 Swallow
 Great tit 
 Sedge warbler
 Grasshopper warbler
 Skylark 
 Song thrush
 Nightjar
 Tawny owl

Music video
The video, performed by Drew Colby, uses shadowgraphy or "hand shadow puppetry" to show two birds struggling to find food for their chicks. Colby used hand shadows to produce the images of birds, spiders and landscapes, which were there composited together digitally. Text at the end of the video explains that since 1966, the UK has lost over 40 million birds and that "time is running out to save the rest". The RSPB also created a subtitled video, highlighting the name of each bird as it sings.

Reception
Andy Welch, writing for The Guardian, called "Let Nature Sing" "strangely comforting and a welcome sound for anyone who has ever enjoyed a dawn chorus". Joe Shute in the Daily Telegraph described its appearance during The Official Chart Show  as "rather magical".

Chart performance
"Let Nature Sing" debuted at number 11 in the mid-week chart, and reached number 3 in the Official Trending Chart, with a final position of 18 in the full weekly chart. The single was the best-selling of the week, with 23,500 units sold.

Weekly charts

See also
 Birdsong (radio channel)

References

External links
 Let Nature Sing campaign page
 "Let Nature Sing" on YouTube

Bird sounds
Songs about birds
Environmental songs
Music videos featuring puppetry
Royal Society for the Protection of Birds
2019 singles
Visual arts by animals
2019 songs